Cameleon is a 1997 British drama film directed by Ceri Sherlock. The film was selected as the British entry for the Best Foreign Language Film at the 71st Academy Awards, but was not accepted as a nominee.

Cast
 Daniel Evans as Elfed Davies
 Simon Fisher as Howell Thomas
 Aneirin Hughes as Delme Davies
 Phylip Hughes as David George
 Iris Jones as Hannah-Jane

See also
 List of submissions to the 71st Academy Awards for Best Foreign Language Film
 List of British submissions for the Academy Award for Best Foreign Language Film

References

External links
 

1997 films
1997 drama films
British drama films
Welsh-language films
1990s British films